Kasena or Kassena (Kasem or Kassem) is the language of the Kassena ethnic group and is a Gur language spoken in the Upper East Region of northern Ghana and in Burkina Faso.

Orthography
An independent 30-letter alphabet called the Goulsse alphabet (from gʋlse, “writing” in Mooré) was devised by Burkinabé app developer Wenitte Apiou, Babaguioue Micareme Akouabou and Kassem linguist Fernand Ki in summer of 2021 based on the geometrical patterns found in Kassena architecture. The alphabet is also planned to be applicable for the related Mooré language as well.

Phonology

Tone
Kasena has three tones, a high tone, a mid level tone and a low tone. Tonal changes either change the lexical meaning of a word or its grammatical function. 

Lexical

Grammatical

Grammar

Noun Class System

There are five classes of nouns that can be identified in Kasena. These classes correspond to grammatical genders and are differentiated in terms of number, such that there are five classes for singular nouns and five classes for plural nouns.

Pronouns

Personal Pronouns/Possessive Pronouns
There are two classes of personal pronouns. One class is referring to humans, whereas the other class is referring to non-human entities. The personal pronouns are also used as possessive pronouns, thus there is no special form for possessive pronouns in Kasena. 

Human personal pronouns

Non-human personal pronouns

Emphatic Pronouns

Reciprocal Pronouns
Reciprocity is expressed by the pronoun daanɪ, which sometimes occurs as a prefix or suffix.

Reflexive Pronouns
Reflexivity is expressed by a personal pronoun to which either tɪtɪ or katɪ ('-self')is added.

Relative Pronouns
Relative pronouns are formed on the basis of the personal pronouns for non-human entities to which the suffix -lʊ is attached.

Indefinite Pronouns

Demonstrative Pronouns

Interrogative Pronouns

Syntax

Word Order
The Kasena language has a basic SVO word order.

References

External links
Languages of Ghana
Kassena-Ninkarse.org
Riddles in Kasena
The VP-periphery in Mabia languages
Web version of Ethnologue

Languages of Burkina Faso
Languages of Ghana
Gurunsi languages